Stephano Mwasika (born 1 September 1987) is a retired Tanzanian football defender.

References

1987 births
Living people
Tanzanian footballers
Tanzania international footballers
Prisons F.C. players
Moro United F.C. players
Young Africans S.C. players
Ruvu Shooting F.C. players
Friends Rangers F.C. players
Kinondoni Municipal Council F.C. players
Namungo F.C. players
African Lyon F.C. players
Association football defenders
Tanzanian Premier League players